The Virginia League was a minor league baseball affiliation which operated in Virginia and North Carolina from 1906 to 1928. It was classified as a "C" league from 1906 to 1919 and as a "B" league from 1920 to 1928.

The most famous alumni to come out of the league were World War II hero, General Frank A. Armstrong (the highest-ranking military officer to have played professional baseball), and Hall of Fame members Rick Ferrell, Sam Rice, Chief Bender, Pie Traynor, and Hack Wilson. Chief Bender, Art Devlin,  Gabby Street and Zinn Beck served as managers in the league.

Virginia League Champions † 

† Playoffs were not held at the end of most seasons. In those cases, the Champions listed were the teams who ended the regular season in first place.

Complete team list (1906-1928)

↑ Also spelled "Bronchos."

‡ This team had no known nickname.

References

Defunct minor baseball leagues in the United States
Baseball in Virginia
Baseball leagues in North Carolina
Baseball leagues in Virginia
Sports leagues established in 1906
1906 establishments in Virginia
1906 establishments in North Carolina
Sports leagues disestablished in 1928
1928 disestablishments in the United States